The Cambrian Bright Angel Shale is the middle layer of the three member Tonto Group geologic feature. The 3-rock Tonto section famously sits upon the Great Unconformity because of the highly resistant cliffs of the base layer, vertical Tapeats Sandstone cliffs.

The Bright Angel Shale is easily identified for two reasons. Its soft-greenish color stands out against the browns, reds, and whites of neighboring rock units. And secondly for its slope-forming character against mostly cliff-forming resistant rocks.

It is a nonresistant slope-forming unit. The Bright Angel Shale consists of green and purple-red, siltstone and shale which is interbedded with red-brown to brown sandstone that is similar in lithology to the underlying Tapeats Sandstone. The Bright Angel Shale underlies and interfingers with Muav Limestone. The Bright Angel Shale is located in the lower elevations of the Grand Canyon, Arizona.

The units of the Tonto Group and the colorful Bright Angel Shale are easily identified as a geological sequence beneath the tall cliffs of the Redwall Limestone (the Redwall sits upon a short resistant cliff of Muav Limestone); the Tonto Group is also easily seen beside Granite Gorge of the Colorado River and the Vishnu Basement Rocks 

The units of the Tonto Group:
 5 – Frenchman Mountain Dolostone
 4 – Muav Limestone
 3 – Bright Angel Shale
 2 – Tapeats Sandstone (start of transgression series)
 1 – Sixtymile Formation

See also

 Geology of the Grand Canyon area
 List of fossiliferous stratigraphic units in Arizona
 Paleontology in Arizona

References

Further reading 
 Blakey, Ron and Wayne Ranney, Ancient Landscapes of the Colorado Plateau, Grand Canyon Association (publisher), 2008, 176 pages, 
 Brandriss, M. (2004) Angular unconformity between Proterozoic and Cambrian rocks, Grand Canyon, Arizona. GeoDIL, A Geoscience Digital Image Library, University of North Dakota, Grand Forks, North Dakota.
 Lucchitta, Ivo, Hiking Arizona's Geology, 2001, Mountaineers's Books, 
 Mathis, A., and C. Bowman (2007) The Grand Age of Rocks: The Numeric Ages for Rocks Exposed within Grand Canyon, Grand Canyon National Park, Arizona, National Park Service, Grand Canyon National Park, Arizona.
 Share, J.  (2102a) The Great Unconformity of the Grand Canyon and the Late Proterozoic-Cambrian Time Interval: Part I – Defining It.
 Share, J.  (2102a) The Great Unconformity and the Late Proterozoic-Cambrian Time Interval: Part II - The Rifting of Rodinia and the "Snowball Earth" Glaciations That Followed.
 Timmons, M. K. Karlstrom, and C. Dehler (1999) Grand Canyon Supergroup Six Unconformities Make One Great Unconformity A Record of Supercontinent Assembly and Disassembly. Boatman's Quarterly Review. vol. 12, no. 1, pp. 29–32.
 Timmons, S. S. (2003) Learning to Read the Pages of a Book (Grand Canyon Geology Training Manual), National Park Service, Grand Canyon National Park, Arizona.

Shale formations of the United States
Natural history of the Grand Canyon
Geologic formations of Arizona
Geologic formations of Nevada
Cambrian Arizona
Cambrian Nevada
Cambrian System of North America
Cambrian southern paleotropical deposits